In certain civil law jurisdictions (e.g., France, Quebec, Mexico, etc.), the patrimoine d'affectation is property, assets, or a legal estate that can be divided for a fiduciary purpose, as being distinct from a person's general assets.  It is similar in some respects to the way under common law property is held, managed, or invested in trust by a trustee for the benefit of third parties (beneficiaries). The affected property remains outside the grantor's assets; therefore, even if the grantor goes bankrupt, becomes insolvent, or incurs liabilities, the property remains untouchable and may continue to benefit the intended beneficiaries.

Originally proposed as a way of explaining the common law trust, the concept was first put forward by the French jurist Pierre Lepaulle who based it on the German Zweckvermögen.

References

Civil law (legal system)